Sporting Clube da Covilhã, commonly known as just Sporting da Covilhã, is Portuguese football club from the city of Covilhã that plays in the second-tier Liga Portugal 2. The club was founded in 1923. Their nickname is the Leões da Serra, meaning "Lions of the Mountain Range," due to Covilhã's location in the Serra de Estrela, the highest mountains in Portugal.

Their home ground is Estádio Municipal José dos Santos Pinto, located at approximately 900 m of altitude. However, SCC play sometimes at a more recent Complexo Desportivo da Covilhã in Covilhã, which holds a capacity of 3,000 spectators. Their current chairman is José Oliveira Mendes and current manager is Ernesto Cangalho. They have won five Second Division in 1948, 1969, 1987 (second-tier), 2002, and 2005 (third-tier). The club is now in their first consecutive presence in the best tier.

Players

Current squad

Former notable players
  Alireza Haghighi
  Pizzi
  Rui Barros

Honours
 Portuguese First Division (15 participations)
 Portuguese Second Division (11 participations) – 1948–49, 1958–59, 1986–87, 1996–97, 1999–00, 2002–03, 2005–06, 2008–09, 2009–10, 2010–11, 2011–12
 Portuguese Cup – Runners-up (1) – 1956–1957

Managerial history

 Vieira Niunes (1985–1988)
 Vieira Niunes (1995–1996)
 António Jasus (1996–1997)
 Vieira Niunes (1997)
 António Jasus (1999–2000)
 Henrique Niunes (2000–2001)
 João Cavalero (2002–2004)
 Fernando Pirze (2004–2005)
 José Dinize (2005–2006)
 João Salcedaze (2006)
 Vítor Quiunha (2006–2007)
 Rui França (2007–2008)
 Álvaro Magalhães (2008)
 Hélio Sousa (2008–2009)
 João Eusébio (2009)
 Nicolau Vaquero (2009–2010)
 João Salcedaze (2010)
 João Pinto (2010–2011)
 Tulipa (2011–2012)
 Nascimento (2012)
 Filipe Morera (2012–)
 Filó (2021)
 Leonel Pontes (2021–2022)
 Alex (2022–)

Club anthem
De verde e branco, Um dia te embriagaram; 
De verde engalanaram, Os teus pés. 
O branco escorreu-te, Das feições, 
Onde moras, E onde mostras o que és! e Entre os maiores 
Te sentes piqueno, Mas és na Beira 
Rico em tradições, Agarra que te vem 
De seres leão, Já tem feito tremer 
Os aldeões!

Pelos anos contados, És velhinho, Mas continuas sempre 
A ser um jovenzinho; D`esperança 
Traçaram teu carinho, Força e coragem 
O que te moem, O ar que te embriaga 
Puro e leve, Te inspira e te dá fecundidade? 
Que seja lema teu, Por toda a vila 
A grandeza, leite Gresso, A humidade

League and cup history

A.  Despite finishing in a relegation position, the club was not relegated due to União de Leiria of the Primeira Liga being relegated to the non-professional tiers of Portugal due to there financial difficulties suffered during the 2011–12 Primeira Liga season.

Last updated: 22 July 2012
Div. = Division; 1D = Portuguese League; 2H = Liga de Honra; 2DS/2D = Portuguese Second Division; 3DS = Terceira Divisão
Pos. = Position; Pl = Match played; W = Win; D = Draw; L = Lost; GS = Goal scored; GA = Goal against; P = Points

References

External links
 Official Site 
 Club Profile at ForaDeJogo 
 Club Profile at LPFP 
 Club Profile at NationalFootballTeams
 Club Profile at Zerozero

 
Football clubs in Portugal
Association football clubs established in 1923
1923 establishments in Portugal
Primeira Liga clubs
Liga Portugal 2 clubs